Halic may refer to:

 Haliç - a village in Turkey
 The Golden Horn, known by its modern Turkish name as Haliç
 Halič - a village in Slovakia
 Stará Halič - a village in Slovakia
 Haliç Bridge (disambiguation)
 Halič - Slovak and Czech name for Galicia (Eastern Europe)